The Colour of the Chameleon (translit. Tsvetat Na Chameleona) is a 2012 Bulgarian comedy film directed by Emil Hristov. The film was selected as the Bulgarian entry for the Best Foreign Language Film at the 86th Academy Awards, but it was not nominated.

Cast
 Lilia Abadjieva as Pravda Cherneva
 Mihail Bilalov as Aleko Polyanski
 Rousy Chanev as Mlyakov
 Deyan Donkov as Kokalov
 Samuel Finzi as Chamov
 Hristo Garbov as The Minister of Interior
 Vassilena Getschkova as Diana Manolova
 Vasilena Getskova as Diana Manolova
 Iordanka Ioveva as Tribadzhakova

See also
 List of submissions to the 86th Academy Awards for Best Foreign Language Film
 List of Bulgarian submissions for the Academy Award for Best Foreign Language Film

References

External links
 

2012 films
2012 comedy films
Bulgarian comedy films
2010s Bulgarian-language films
Films shot in Bulgaria
Films set in Bulgaria
2012 directorial debut films